Tore Sinding-Larsen (22 October 1929 – 8 September 2013) was a Norwegian judge.

He was born in Bergen. He worked under the Norwegian Parliamentary Ombudsman from 1963, and was a Supreme Court Justice from 1977 to 1997.

References

1929 births
2013 deaths
Lawyers from Bergen
Supreme Court of Norway justices